Ulëz  is a city and administrative unit in the municipality of Mat, Albania. It has a population of 1,229 as of the 2011 Albanian census. Ulëz is home to the Ulëz Hydroelectric Power Station and designated as part of the Ulza Regional Nature Park.

References 

Administrative units of Mat (municipality)
Former municipalities in Dibër County
Towns in Albania